The Oise is a river of Belgium and France, flowing for  from its source in the Belgian province of Hainaut, south of Chimay. It flows into the Seine at Conflans-Sainte-Honorine, a north-western suburb of Paris. Its main tributary is the Aisne. It gave its name to the French departments of Oise and Val-d'Oise.

Places along the river

In France, the Oise flows through the following départements and towns:
Aisne: Hirson, Guise, Chauny
Oise (named after the river): Noyon, Compiègne, Creil
Val-d'Oise (named after the river): Auvers-sur-Oise, Pontoise, Cergy, Jouy-le-Moutier
Yvelines: Conflans-Sainte-Honorine

Navigation

Over the past few centuries, the Oise has played an important role as an inland shipping waterway connecting the Seine (and thus Paris) with the coastal regions of northern France, Belgium, and the Netherlands. With the projected construction of the Seine-Nord Europe Canal, a high-capacity water transport system currently in development, the Oise will be linked at Janville, north of Compiègne, with the high-capacity Canal Dunkerque-Escaut, east of Arleux. The Seine-Nord Europe Canal will replace the old Canal de Saint-Quentin and the current Canal du Nord, the capacity of which is far below standard. When the new Seine-Nord connection is complete, it will allow large vessels to transport goods from the Seine, and thus Paris and its surrounding area, to the ports of Dunkirk, Antwerp and Rotterdam.

Part of the overall project consists in upgrading the river Oise itself between Creil and Compiègne, a project called MAGEO (Mise au gabarit européen de l'Oise) that was put out to public consultation in 2013. Some bends need to be eased and bridges raised to meet the requirements of a class Vb inland waterway.

Tributaries

Tributaries include

Right bank
 Noirieu
 Divette
 Mas or Matz
 Aronde
 Brèche
 Thérain

Left bank
 Gland
 Thon
 Serre
 Ailette
 Ru de Servais
 Aisne
 Automne
 Nonette
 Thève

See also
 Canal latéral à l'Oise
 List of rivers of France
 List of canals in France

References

External links
 River Oise and Canal latéral à l'Oise maps and information, on places, ports and moorings on the canal, by the author of Inland Waterways of France, Imray

 Navigation details for 80 French rivers and canals (French waterways website section)

 
International rivers of Europe
Rivers of Belgium
Rivers of France
Rivers of Aisne
Rivers of Oise
Rivers of Val-d'Oise
Rivers of Yvelines
Rivers of Hauts-de-France
Rivers of Île-de-France
Rivers of Hainaut (province)
Rivers of the Ardennes (Belgium)
Rivers of the Ardennes (France)
Chimay